"Breaking Up Was Easy in the 90s" is a song by American country music singer Sam Hunt. It was released on October 12, 2020 as the fifth single from his second studio album Southside. Hunt wrote the song with Zach Crowell, Chris LaCorte, Ernest K. Smith and Josh Osborne, and produced by Zach Crowell.

Background
"In the 90s, there was no SNS, like: Facebook, Twitter, Instagram or more, so break ups in the 90's were not easier", Hunt said in an interview. "The trick was not filling it up with a bunch of technology references and trying to find the story within it. It's just the world's so much smaller now. In a lot of ways, like the fact that I can release the record and still stay in touch with my fans, there's so many positives. "But when it comes to relationships and navigating old relationships or new relationships and especially breakups".

Music video
The video was released on November 25, 2020, directed by Justin Clough. It is a story of a man who was just released from prison. As he tries to get his life back on track, the man finds himself haunted by memories of a past girlfriend.

Live performance
Hunt performed the song on The Tonight Show Starring Jimmy Fallon.

Charts

Weekly charts

Year-end charts

Certifications

References

2020 singles
2020 songs
Sam Hunt songs
Songs written by Zach Crowell
Songs written by Sam Hunt
Songs written by Josh Osborne
MCA Nashville Records singles
Songs written by Ernest (musician)